The 2010–11 Israeli Hockey League season was the 20th season of Israel's hockey league. Eight teams participated in the league, and HC Metulla won the league title.

Regular season

Group A
HC Metulla 15
HC Ma'alot 9
Maccabi Metula 8
HC Bat Yam 4

Group B
HC Herzlia 18
Haifa Hawks 16
HC Bat Yam II (Holon) 3
Rehovot 3

Final tournament

3rd place
 Icebergs Bat Yam – Maccabi Zairei Metulla 2:6 (2:0, 0:3, 0:3)

Final
 HC Metulla - Monfort Ma'alot 5:1 (0:0, 1:0, 4:1)

External links
 2010-11 season overview
 List of Israeli champions on hockeyarenas.net

Israeli Hockey League Season, 2010-11
Israeli League (ice hockey) seasons
Seasons